Tallow tree is a common name for several tree species and may refer to:

Detarium senegalense, native to tropical West Africa
Triadica sebifera, native to eastern Asia

See also 
 Tallow wood